AHZ may refer to:

 Attohertz, in frequency measurement, 10−18 Hz
 Alpe d'Huez Airport's IATA designation
 Arnhem Zuid railway station's code
 Academy of Foreign Trade in Lwów or 
 Hungarian State Symphony Orchestra or 
 Ahz, a fictional place in the 1981 episode "Scooby's Trip to Ahz" of Scooby-Doo and Scrappy-Doo

See also
A structure of the enzyme alcohol oxidase (PDB code 1AHZ)